Remixes is a two-disc compilation of Four Tet remixes. It was released on 25 September 2006. The first disc contains twelve Four Tet remixes selected by Hebden, while the second disc comprises every official remix to date (both by himself and by other artists) of Four Tet tracks. Many of the tracks included in this compilation had previously been available on vinyl only.

Track listing

Disc One: Remixes

Disc Two: Remixed

References

External links
Remixes release page from the Domino Records website

Four Tet albums
2006 remix albums
Domino Recording Company remix albums